Ashutosh Shukla is an Indian politician of the Bharatiya Janata Party. He is a member of the 18th Uttar Pradesh Assembly, representing the Bhagwantnagar Assembly constituency.

Early life and education 
Ashutosh Shukla was born in Unnao district, Uttar Pradesh to the family of Suryanarayan Shukla in 1966.

He completed his education in Masters of Arts in Political Science Honors from DSN College, Kanpur University.

References 

Uttar Pradesh MLAs 2022–2027
Bharatiya Janata Party politicians from Uttar Pradesh
1966 births
Living people